is a town located in Ibaraki Prefecture, Japan. The percentage of the population aged over 65 was 46.6%.

Geography
Located in northwestern Ibaraki Prefecture along the upper reaches of the Kuji River, Daigo is bordered to the north by Fukushima Prefecture and to the west by Tochigi Prefecture.

Surrounding municipalities
Ibaraki Prefecture
 Hitachiōta
 Hitachiōmiya
Fukushima Prefecture
 Yamatsuri
 Tanagura
Tochigi Prefecture
Ōtawara
Nakagawa

Climate
Although the altitude is relatively low at 120 meters, Daigo is very chilly in the morning and evening in winter because it is located in a basin. The average minimum temperature of minus 5.5 ℃ in January is almost the same as Morioka, Iwate, much further north, and Daigo is known for having some of the coldest winters in the Kantō region. However, during the daytime, the temperature rises to nearly 10 °C due to solar radiation. In addition, summers often record hot days.

Demographics
Per Japanese census data, the population of Daigo has decreased drastically and is now less than half of what it was 60 years ago.

History
Daigo village was created with the establishment of the modern municipalities system on April 1, 1889. It was elevated to town status on July 20, 1891. On March 31, 1955, the villages of Yorigami, Fukuroda, Miyagawa, Kurosawa, Namase, Kamiogawa, Shimoogawa and Murotono merged with Daigo.

Government
Daigo has a mayor-council form of government with a directly elected mayor and a unicameral town council of 13 members. Daigo, together with neighbouring Hitachiōta, contributes two members to the Ibaraki Prefectural Assembly. In terms of national politics, the town is part of Ibaraki 5th district of the lower house of the Diet of Japan.

Economy
Daigo is noted for many onsens (hot springs) and agricultural products of many kinds. 

Besides that Daigo is well known for its tea production. It is one of the northernmost places in Japan where tea grows. The area's fertile soil, clean air, and mild climate provide ideal growing conditions for tea plants. Tea production has been a vital part of Daigo's economy and culture for centuries, with many small family-run tea farms still operating in the region.

Education
Daigo has six public elementary schools and four public middle schools operated by the city government, and one public high school operated by the Ibaraki Prefectural Board of Education. There is also one private high school. The prefecture also operates one special education school for the handicapped.

Transportation

Railway
 JR East – Suigun Line
 -  -  -  -

Highway

Local attractions
Fukuroda Falls – one of Japan's Top 100 Waterfalls 
Daigo onsen
Fukuroda onsen

Noted people
Yasunori Kikuchi, professional baseball player
Yasumitsu Toyoda, professional baseball player

References

External links

Official Website 

Towns in Ibaraki Prefecture
Daigo, Ibaraki